Qarakazımlı (also, Karakyazimli, Karakyazimly, and Karakyazymly) is a village and municipality in the Jalilabad Rayon of Azerbaijan.  It has a population of 801.

References 

Populated places in Jalilabad District (Azerbaijan)